Nicole Lough (born 1995) is a former British Paralympic swimmer who competed at international level events. She swum mainly breaststroke swimming events and was a World and European bronze medalist.

References

1995 births
Living people
Sportspeople from South Shields
Paralympic swimmers of Great Britain
Medalists at the World Para Swimming Championships
Medalists at the World Para Swimming European Championships
S14-classified Paralympic swimmers
British female breaststroke swimmers
21st-century British women